Aconit is a general purpose stealth frigate of the French Navy. Initially to be named , she is now the fourth French vessel named after the FNFL corvette .

Service history
She took part in the action of 9 April 2009.

Based in Toulon, the frigate was reported active in the Mediterranean as of 2021, taking part in the Mare Aperto exercises with the Italian Navy in October.

In September 2022, the frigate deployed to the Indian Ocean participating in exercises with the Egyptian Navy en route. From November 25 to December 8, the frigate was engaged in joint "Pearl of the West" exercises between French forces based in the United Arab Emirates and the Kuwaiti Armed Forces. The frigate returned to her base at Toulon on 22 December 2022.

Upgrade
Aconit began a major life extension upgrade in February 2023. The upgrade is designed to permit the frigate to operate through the 2020s and into the 2030s and incorporates the addition of hull-mounted sonar, improved point air defence systems, the CANTO anti-torpedo countermeasures system, as well as the capacity to deploy the latest variant of the Exocet anti-ship missile. The ship is expected to remain in dry dock until July and, after the completion of her refit and return to operational service, remain active until 2034.

References

Gallery

La Fayette-class frigates
Frigates of France
1997 ships
Ships built in France